Chaman Lal Gupta (13 April 1934 – 18 May 2021) was an Indian politician from Jammu and Kashmir, belonging to Bharatiya Janata Party. He was union minister of state of defence from 2002 to 2004. Earlier, he held a portfolio of food processing and civil aviation.
He was born in 1934 in Jammu and did his MSC from G. M. Science College Jammu (Jammu and Kashmir) and  Allahabad University, Allahabad (Uttar Pradesh). He was elected to Jammu and Kashmir State Assembly in 1972 as a member of Jana Sangh. He was elected to Lok Sabha in 1996, 1998, and 1999 from Udhampur (Lok Sabha constituency). He was a member of J&K Vidhan Sabha again from 2008 to 2014, as an MLA from  Jammu West. 

He had not been keeping well in his mid 80s. He died of COVID-19 on 18 May 2021, in Jammu, during the COVID-19 pandemic in India.

Positions held
1972–77               Member, Jammu and Kashmir Legislative Assembly
1987–90               Member, Jammu and Kashmir Legislative Assembly & Member, Public Accounts Committee; Public Undertakings Committee;
1973–80               General-Secretary, Bharatiya Jana Sangh (B.J.S.), Jammu and Kashmir
1980–89               General-Secretary, Bharatiya Janata Party (B.J.P.), Jammu and Kashmir
1990–95               President, B.J.P., Jammu and Kashmir (two terms)
1996                  Elected to 11th Lok Sabha, from Udhampur 
1996–97               Member, Committee on Transport and Tourism
1998                  Re-elected to 12th Lok Sabha (2nd term)
1998–99               Member, Joint Committee on the functioning of Wakf Board
1999                   Re-elected to 13th Lok Sabha (3rd term)
1999–2001            Union Minister of State, Ministry of Civil Aviation
2001–2002            Union  Minister of State  (Independent Charge), Ministry of Food
1 July 2002 – 2004      Union Minister of State, Ministry of  Defence
2008-2014            Member, Jammu and Kashmir Legislative Assembly Jammu West

Books published 
Sansad mein Jammu Kashmir;
Sansad mein dedh varsh;
Mere Prayaas
Article 370 : A Thorn

References

External links
Biographical Sketch: Member of Parliament  of the 13th Lok Sabha 

2021 deaths
1934 births
University of Allahabad alumni
India MPs 1996–1997
India MPs 1999–2004
India MPs 1998–1999
People from Jammu (city)
Lok Sabha members from Jammu and Kashmir
Bharatiya Jana Sangh politicians
Bharatiya Janata Party politicians from Jammu and Kashmir
Politicians from Jammu
Deaths from the COVID-19 pandemic in India
Jammu and Kashmir MLAs 1972–1977
Jammu and Kashmir MLAs 2008–2014
Jammu and Kashmir MLAs 2014–2018